Driopea clytina is a species of beetle in the family Cerambycidae. It was described by Pascoe in 1858.

References

Driopea
Beetles described in 1858